Treffpunkt Aimée is an East German film. It was released in 1956.

External links
 

1956 films
East German films
1950s German-language films
Films set in Berlin
1950s German films
German crime films
1956 crime films
German black-and-white films